Azerbaijan is a country in the Caucasus region, situated at the juncture of Europe and Western Asia. Three physical features dominate Azerbaijan: the Caspian Sea, whose shoreline forms a natural boundary to the east; the Greater Caucasus mountain range to the north; and the extensive flatlands at the country's center. About the size of Portugal or the US state of Maine, Azerbaijan has a total land area of approximately 86,600 square kilometers, less than 1% of the land area of the former Soviet Union. Of the three Transcaucasian states, Azerbaijan has the greatest land area. Special administrative subdivisions are the Nakhchivan Autonomous Republic, which is separated from the rest of Azerbaijan by a strip of Armenian territory, and the Nagorno-Karabakh Autonomous Region, entirely within Azerbaijan. The status of Nagorno-Karabakh is disputed by Armenia, but is internationally recognized as territory of Azerbaijan.

Located in the region of the southern Caucasus Mountains, Azerbaijan borders the Caspian Sea to the east, Georgia and Russia to the north, Iran to the south, and Armenia to the southwest and west. A small part of Nakhchivan also borders Turkey to the northwest. The capital of Azerbaijan is the ancient city of Baku, which has the largest and best harbor on the Caspian Sea and has long been the center of the republic's oil industry.

Topography and drainage

The elevation changes over a relatively short distance from lowlands to highlands; nearly half the country is considered mountainous. Notable physical features are the gently undulating hills of the subtropical southeastern coast, which are covered with tea plantations, orange groves, and lemon groves; numerous mud volcanoes and mineral springs in the ravines of Kobustan Mountain near Baku; and coastal terrain that lies as much as twenty-eight meters below sea level.

Except for its eastern Caspian shoreline and some areas bordering Georgia and Iran, Azerbaijan is ringed by mountains. To the northeast, bordering Russia's Dagestan Autonomous Republic, is the Greater Caucasus range; to the west, bordering Armenia, is the Lesser Caucasus range. To the extreme southeast, the Talysh Mountains form part of the border with Iran. The highest elevations occur in the Greater Caucasus, where Mount Bazardüzü rises 4,466 meters above sea level. Eight large rivers flow down from the Caucasus ranges into the central Kura-Aras Lowlands, alluvial flatlands and low delta areas along the seacoast designated by the Azerbaijani name for the Mtkvari River (Kura) and its main tributary, the Aras. The Mtkvari, the longest river in the Caucasus region, forms the delta and drains into the Caspian a short distance downstream from the confluence with the Aras. The Mingechaur Reservoir, with an area of 605 square kilometers that makes it the largest body of water in Azerbaijan, was formed by damming the Kura in western Azerbaijan. The waters of the reservoir provide hydroelectric power and irrigation of the Kura-Aras plain. Most of the country's rivers are not navigable. About 15% of the land in Azerbaijan is arable.

Mountains
The country's highest peak, Bazardüzü, rises to 4,485 m in this range at the Azerbaijan-Russia border.

Climate

Temperature
The climate varies from subtropical and humid in the southeast to subtropical and dry in central and eastern Azerbaijan.

Precipitation
Physiographic conditions and different atmosphere circulations admit 8 types of air currents including continental, sea, arctic, tropical currents of air that formulates the climate of the Republic. The maximum annual precipitation falls in Lenkeran (1,600 to 1,800 mm.) and the minimum in Absheron (200 to 350 mm.). The maximum daily precipitation of 334 mm was observed at the Bilieser Station in 1955.

Environmental problems

Air and water pollution are widespread and pose great challenges to economic development. Major sources of pollution include oil refineries and chemical and metallurgical industries, which in the early 1990s continued to operate as inefficiently as they had in the Soviet era. Air quality is extremely poor in Baku, the center of oil refining. Some reports have described Baku's air as the most polluted in the former Soviet Union, and other industrial centers suffer similar problems.

The Caspian Sea, including Baku Bay, has been polluted by oil leakages and the dumping of raw or inadequately treated sewage, reducing the yield of caviar and fish. In the Soviet period, Azerbaijan was pressed to use extremely heavy applications of pesticides to improve its output of scarce subtropical crops for the rest of the Soviet Union. The continued regular use of the pesticide DDT in the 1970s and 1980s was an egregious lapse, although that chemical was officially banned in the Soviet Union because of its toxicity to humans. Excessive application of pesticides and chemical fertilizers has caused extensive groundwater pollution and has been linked by Azerbaijani scientists to birth defects and illnesses. Rising water levels in the Caspian Sea, mainly caused by natural factors exacerbated by man-made structures, have reversed the decades-long drying trend and now threaten coastal areas; the average level rose 1.5 meters between 1978 and 1993. Because of the Nagorno-Karabakh conflict, large numbers of trees were felled, roads were built through pristine areas, and large expanses of agricultural land were occupied by military forces.

Like other former Soviet republics, Azerbaijan faces a gigantic environmental cleanup complicated by the economic uncertainties left in the wake of the Moscow-centered planning system. The Committee for the Protection of the Natural Environment is part of the Azerbaijani government, but in the early 1990s it was ineffective at targeting critical applications of limited funds, establishing pollution standards, or monitoring compliance with environmental regulations. Early in 1994, plans called for Azerbaijan to participate in the international Caspian Sea Forum, sponsored by the European Union (EU).

 Natural hazards
 Droughts and floods; some lowland areas threatened by rising levels of the Caspian Sea
 Environment—current issues
 Local scientists consider the Abseron Yasaqligi (Apsheron Peninsula) (including Baky and Sumqayit) and the Caspian Sea to be the ecologically most devastated area in the world because of severe air, water, and soil pollution; soil pollution results from the use of DDT as a pesticide and also from toxic defoliants used in the production of cotton.
 Environment - international agreements
 Party to: Air Pollution, Biodiversity, Climate Change, Desertification, Endangered Species, Hazardous Wastes, Marine Dumping, Ozone Layer Protection, Ship Pollution, Wetlands

Area and boundaries
 Area
 Total: 86,600 km² - country comparison to the world: 113
 Land: 82,629 km²
 Water: 3,971 km²
 Note: Includes the exclave of Nakhchivan Autonomous Republic and the Nagorno-Karabakh region; the region's autonomy was abolished by Azerbaijani Supreme Soviet on November 26, 1991.

 Area comparative
 Australia comparative: larger than Tasmania
 Canada comparative: larger than New Brunswick
 United Kingdom comparative: slightly larger than Scotland
 United States comparative: slightly smaller than Maine
 EU comparative: slightly smaller than Portugal
 Land boundaries
 Total: 2,468 km
 Border countries: Armenia (with Azerbaijan-proper) 566 km, Armenia (with Azerbaijan-Nakhchivan exclave) 221 km, Georgia 428 km, Iran (with Azerbaijan-proper) 432 km, Iran (with Azerbaijan-Nakhchivan exclave) 700 km, Russia 338 km, Turkey 17 km
 Coastline
 Mostly landlocked, but has a 713 km coastline with the Caspian Sea.
 Maritime claims
 None 
 Terrain
 large, flat lowland (much of it below sea-level) with Great Caucasus Mountains to the north, uplands in the west
 Elevation extremes
 Lowest point: Caspian Sea -28 m
 Highest point: Bazardüzü 4,466 m (on the border with Russia)
 Highest peak entirely within Azeri territory: Shah Dagi 4,243 m

Islands

Resources and land use

 Natural resources
 Petroleum, natural gas, iron ore, nonferrous metals, bauxite
 Land use
 Arable land: 22.95%
 Permanent crops: 2.79%
 Other: 74.26% (2012 est.)
 Irrigated land
 14,250 km² (2010)
 Total renewable water resources
 34.68 km3 (2011)
 Freshwater withdrawal (domestic/industrial/agricultural)
 Total: 12.21 km3/yr (4%/18%/78%)
 Per capita: 1,384 cu m/yr (2010)

See also

References

General references